Triflorensia is a genus of flowering plants in the family Rubiaceae. It is endemic to Australia.

Species

References

External links 
 World Checklist of Rubiaceae

Rubiaceae genera
Pavetteae
Taxa named by Sally T. Reynolds